Roger Bailleux (3 August 1913 – 13 April 1988) was a French racing cyclist. He rode in the 1939 Tour de France.

References

External links
 

1913 births
1988 deaths
French male cyclists
Place of birth missing
20th-century French people